() is a county under the jurisdiction of Zhoushan, Zhejiang Province. The postal code is 316200, and the county seat is located on 88 Renmin Road, Gaoting Town.

The county is located in East China Sea in northeast Zhejiang. It comprises a series of islands with Daishan Island forming the main part of the county. Daishan Island has a fishing port, and shipbuilding and ship refitting facilities. The island has several museums including salt, marine life, typhoon and lifehouse museums.

Administrative divisions
The county consists of six towns and one township.
Towns

Townships
Xiushan Township

Climate

References

 
County-level divisions of Zhejiang
Island counties of China
Zhoushan
Islands of Zhejiang
Islands of the East China Sea
Archipelagoes of the Pacific Ocean